The 1996 San Miguel Beermen season was the 22nd season of the franchise in the Philippine Basketball Association (PBA).

Draft picks

Occurrences
In the Commissioners Cup, San Miguel's original choice for an import, Norris Coleman, could not make it on time and the Beermen decided to tapped Agee Ward for their first game against Purefoods. Ward was readily shipped home by the Beermen after scoring only 12 points in the 87-108 loss to the Hotdogs. In San Miguel's next game against Sta.Lucia in Dagupan City, coach Norman Black decided to come out of a six-year retirement and suited up as their import and the Beermen also welcomes the return of Samboy Lim in action.

Notable dates
February 18: The Beermen banked on Allan Caidic's two clutch triples to defeat Purefoods Tender Juicy Hotdogs, 80-69, in the opening game of the season.

March 9: San Miguel held down Pepsi Mega to the league's lowest score yet, a record-low 54 points in a 95-54 victory in Dumaguete City for its third win in the All-Filipino Cup. 

June 30: San Miguel finally got a taste of victory in the Commissioners Cup, crushing sister team Ginebra San Miguel, 112-91, to snap a four-game losing streak. New Import Andre Spencer, who debut last week and the second import to arrived for the Beermen came away with 24 points.  

July 14: A stirring 14-0 counter-assault midway through the final period by the Beermen turn a 65-73 deficit into a surprising 89-77 victory over Formula Shell as the Beermen climbed up in a tie with Sunkist, Ginebra and Purefoods with four wins and four losses. The victory was the fourth straight for San Miguel from a dismal 0-4 start. 

September 29: San Miguel struggled to a 105-104 victory over Mobiline at the start of the Governors Cup. Beermen import Lamont Strothers, who had one-year stints with Portland and Dallas in the NBA and whose PBA campaign took off in the wrong foot when he got involved in an ugly brawl with Mobiline's Jack Tanuan during a pre-tournament game, finished with 45 points and his driving layup with 6.7 seconds left proved to be the decisive basket.  

October 6: San Miguel brought down Sta.Lucia, 97-86, to gain a share of second place in the Governors Cup. Lamont Strothers poured in a season-high 56 points, going 16-of-16 from the free throw line.

Roster

 Team Manager: Nazario Avendaño

Transactions

Trades

Additions

Recruited imports

References

San Miguel Beermen seasons
San